Na-Au-Say Township occupies the 6 mile square on the eastern edge of Kendall County, Illinois. As of the 2010 census, its population was 8,145 and it contained 2,534 housing units.

History
The township's name was chosen by popular vote and came from the Native American village on the Aux Sable Creek (a branch of which flows through the township), which was named for a Potawatomi leader.

Geography

Demographics

Government
The township is governed by an elected Town Board of a Supervisor and four Trustees.  The Township also has an elected Assessor, Clerk, and Highway Commissioner and Supervisor.

References
 

Townships in Kendall County, Illinois
Townships in Illinois